Swanson is a brand of frozen and canned foods.

Swanson may also refer to:

Swanson (surname), people with the surname Swanson
Swanson School of Engineering, a school of the University of Pittsburgh, United States
USS Swanson, a US Navy destroyer
Swanson, Ontario, a settlement in Canada
Swanson, Saskatchewan, a hamlet in Canada
Swanson River, Alaska, United States
Swanson, New Zealand, an outlying suburb of Auckland, New Zealand
Swanson Railway Station, the train station that serves the Auckland, New Zealand suburb
Swanson Science Center, academic building at Washington & Jefferson College, Washington, Pennsylvania, United States
 Swanson Dock, Port of Melbourne, Australia
Swanson Health Products, worldwide distributor of vitamins, supplements and natural health products

See also
 Swanston (disambiguation)
 Swanton (disambiguation)